Jay Kevin Repko (born June 12, 1958) is a former American football tight end who played for the Philadelphia Eagles of the National Football League (NFL). He played college football at University of Pennsylvania and Ursinus College.

References 

1958 births
Living people
American football tight ends
Penn Quakers football players
Ursinus Bears football players
Philadelphia Eagles players